The 2019–20 Melbourne Boomers season is the 37th season for the franchise in the Women's National Basketball League (WNBL).

Deakin University are again the Boomers' naming rights partner, after signing a two-year extension in November 2017.

Roster

Standings

Results

Pre-season

Regular season

Finals

Semi-finals

Awards

In-season

Post-season

Club Awards

References

External links
Melbourne Boomers Official website

2019–20 WNBL season
WNBL seasons by team
2019–20 in Australian basketball
Basketball,Melbourne Boomers
Basketball,Melbourne Boomers